Klaus Pagh (29 July 1935 – 8 December 2020) was a Danish actor, film producer and director. He appeared in more than 30 films between 1956 and 2001.

Selected filmography
 Kira's Reason: A Love Story (2001)
 Girls at Arms 2 (1976)
 Me and the Mafia (1973)
 Sunstroke at the Beach Resort (1973, also directed)
 Amour (1970)
 Soldaterkammerater rykker ud (1959)

References

External links

1935 births
2020 deaths
Danish male film actors
Danish film producers
Danish film directors
20th-century Danish male actors
People from Hørsholm Municipality